Claudio Puelles (born April 21, 1996) is a Peruvian mixed martial artist currently competing in the Lightweight division of the Ultimate Fighting Championship.

Background
Puelles started training Muay Thai around the age of 13, quickly picking up grappling also before transitioning to mixed martial arts in his adolescent years.

Mixed martial arts career

Early career 
Puelles started his professional MMA career in 2013 and fought primarily in Peru. He amassed a record of 7–1 prior to participating in The Ultimate Fighter: Latin America 3.

The Ultimate Fighter Latin America 3
In 2016  Puelles  competed on the third season of The Ultimate Fighter: Latin America 3 series under Team Chuck Liddell.

In the elimination round, Puelles defeated  José David Flores via a technical knockout in the first round. In the quarterfinals, Puelles defeated Pablo Sabori via a submission. In the semifinals, he defeated Marcelo Rojo by a unanimous decision. This win earned him a spot in the finale against  Martín Bravo on November 5, 2016 in Mexico City, Mexico at The Ultimate Fighter Latin America 3 Finale.

Ultimate Fighting Championship

Puelles made his official UFC debut against Martin Bravo on November 5, 2016 in Mexico City, Mexico at The Ultimate Fighter Latin America 3 Finale. He lost the fight via TKO in the second round.

On May 19, 2018, Puelles faced Felipe Silva at UFC Fight Night: Maia vs. Usman.  He won the fight via a submission in round three. The submission gained him a Performance of the Night bonus award.

Puelles faced Marcos Mariano on September 21, 2019, at UFC Fight Night: Rodríguez vs. Stephens. He won the fight via unanimous decision.

Puelles faced Jordan Leavitt on June 5, 2021 at UFC Fight Night: Rozenstruik vs. Sakai. He won the bout via unanimous decision.

Puelles faced Chris Gruetzemacher on December 4, 2021 at UFC on ESPN 31.  He won the fight via a kneebar in round three.

Puelles faced Clay Guida on April 23, 2022 at UFC Fight Night 205. He won the fight via a kneebar in round one. This win earned him a Performance of the Night award.

Puelles faced Dan Hooker on November 12, 2022, at UFC 281. He lost the fight via TKO in round two after being dropped by a front kick to the body.

Championships and accomplishments
Ultimate Fighting Championship
Performance of the Night (Two times)

Mixed martial arts record

|-
|Loss
|align=center|12–3
|Dan Hooker
|TKO (body kick)
|UFC 281
| 
|align=center|2
|align=center|4:06
|New York City, New York, United States
|
|-
|Win
|align=center|12–2
|Clay Guida
|Submission (kneebar)
|UFC Fight Night: Lemos vs. Andrade
|
|align=center|1
|align=center|3:01
|Las Vegas, Nevada, United States
|
|-
|Win
|align=center|11–2
|Chris Gruetzemacher
|Submission (kneebar)	
|UFC on ESPN: Font vs. Aldo 
|
|align=center|3
|align=center|3:26
|Las Vegas, Nevada, United States
|
|-
|Win
|align=center|10–2
|Jordan Leavitt
|Decision (unanimous)
|UFC Fight Night: Rozenstruik vs. Sakai
|
|align=center|3
|align=center|5:00
|Las Vegas, Nevada, United States
|
|-
|Win
|align=center|9–2
|Marcos Mariano
|Decision (unanimous)
|UFC Fight Night: Rodríguez vs. Stephens
|
|align=center|3
|align=center|5:00
|Mexico City, Mexico
|
|-
|Win
|align=center|8–2
|Felipe Silva
|Submission (kneebar)
|UFC Fight Night: Maia vs. Usman
|
|align=center|3
|align=center|2:23
|Santiago, Chile
|
|-
|Loss
|align=center|7–2
|Martin Bravo
|TKO (punches)
|The Ultimate Fighter Latin America 3 Finale: dos Anjos vs. Ferguson
|
|align=center|2
|align=center|1:55
|Mexico City, Mexico
|
|-
|Win
|align=center|7–1
|Alvaro Sugasti
|KO (head kick)
|300 Sparta 6
|
|align=center|1
|align=center|1:24
|Lima, Peru
|
|-
|Win
|align=center|6–1
|Edimar Martins Rayol
|Submission (kneebar)
|Inka FC: Inka Warriors 2
|
|align=center|1
|align=center|2:36
|Lima, Peru
|
|-
|Loss
|align=center|5–1
|David Cubas
|Decision (unanimous)
|Inka FC: Inka Warriors 1
|
|align=center|1
|align=center|2:36
|Lima, Peru
|
|-
|Win
|align=center|5–0
|Lander Duarte Alves
|Decision (unanimous)
|Inka FC 25
|
|align=center|3
|align=center|5:00
|Lima, Peru 
|
|-
|Win
|align=center|4–0
|Guile Calvete
|Submission (rear-naked choke)
|300 Sparta 5
|
|align=center|2
|align=center|N/A
|Lima, Peru
|
|-
|Win
|align=center|3–0
|Manuel Meza
|TKO (cut)
|300 Sparta 4
|
|align=center|3
|align=center|0:00
|Lima, Peru
|
|-
|Win
|align=center|2–0
|Renzo Mendez
|Submission (arm-triangle choke)
|Inka FC 23 
|
|align=center|2
|align=center|0:00
|Lima, Peru
|
|-
|Win
|align=center|1–0
|Angel Alvarez
|Submission (armbar)
|300 Sparta 2
|
|align=center|3
|align=center|N/A
|Lima, Peru
|
|-

See also 
 List of current UFC fighters
 List of male mixed martial artists

References

External links 
  
 

1996 births
Living people
Lightweight mixed martial artists
Mixed martial artists utilizing Muay Thai
Mixed martial artists utilizing Luta Livre
Sportspeople from Lima
Peruvian male mixed martial artists
Peruvian Muay Thai practitioners
Ultimate Fighting Championship male fighters